The Times-Reporter is an American daily newspaper published seven mornings a week in New Philadelphia, Ohio. It is owned by Gannett.

The newspaper was created in 1968 through the merger of The Daily Times of New Philadelphia and The Daily Reporter of Dover, Ohio. They remain the principal cities of its coverage area, which also includes the Tuscarawas County communities of Baltic, Bolivar, Dennison, Gnadenhutten, Newcomerstown, Strasburg, Sugarcreek, Tuscarawas and Uhrichsville; and some coverage of Carroll, Coshocton, Harrison, Holmes and Stark counties.

GateHouse acquired The Times-Reporter in April 2007 from Copley Press. GateHouse later acquired, and changed its name to, Gannett.

The Times-Reporter is related to three other Gannett newspapers in Northeast Ohio, the dailies The Independent of Massillon and The Repository of Canton, and the weekly The Suburbanite in southern Summit County.

References

External links
The Times-Reporter website
The Repository website
The Independent website
The Suburbanite website

Newspapers published in Ohio
Publications established in 1872
Tuscarawas County, Ohio
1872 establishments in Ohio
Gannett publications